Manfred Russell Russell (born 23 September 1988) is a Costa Rican footballer who plays as a midfielder for Cartaginés.

Club career
Russell started his career at Deportivo Saprissa before joining San Carlos ahead of the 2010 Verano season. He returned to Saprissa in 2011. In summer 2015, he joined Guatemalan side Antigua on a year's loan.

International career
On 12 August 2010, he made his international debut in a friendly against Paraguay, the first of five successive friendlies he played that year.

References

External links
 
 

1988 births
Living people
Association football midfielders
Costa Rican footballers
Costa Rica international footballers
Deportivo Saprissa players
A.D. San Carlos footballers
2014 Copa Centroamericana players
Copa Centroamericana-winning players
Expatriate footballers in Guatemala
Antigua GFC players